Hendrik Figee (May 28, 1838, in Haarlem – December 3, 1907, in Haarlem) was a Dutch businessman and entrepreneur credited with expanding the Haarlem factory Figee Crane Company into an international manufacturer of cranes.

Biography

He was the son of Hendrik Figee the elder who attended grade school and later became a surveyor. After passing his surveyor's exam, he went to work for his father in his steam engine factory on the Spaarne river. In 1866, he became a full partner along with his brother Thomas and the company name changed to Gebroeders Figee (Figee brothers). He also helped start the crane manufacturing company Figee & De Kruyff in Amsterdam and the ironworks called the Haarlems IJzergieterij. In 1883, his brother Thomas bought the shipbuilding company Conrad on the other side of the Spaarne river. Werf Conrad had been named after the renowned Dutch engineer Frederik Willem Conrad (1800-1870). Figee wanted to make dredgers (baggermolens). The dredgers needed cranes on board, and these were supplied by Figee, which became a specialist in building cranes. He was a member of the board of the Maatschappij voor Nijverheid en Handel, Haarlem from 1898 to 1902 and was also a member of the board of the Colonial Museum, formerly located in villa Welgelegen.

References

1838 births
1907 deaths
Dutch businesspeople
People from Haarlem